The Gee Bee Model R Super Sportster was a special-purpose racing aircraft made by Granville Brothers Aircraft of Springfield, Massachusetts at the now-abandoned Springfield Airport.  Gee Bee stands for Granville Brothers.

Design and development
The 1932 R-1 and its sister plane, the R-2, were the successors of the previous year's Thompson Trophy-winning Model Z.

Assistant Chief Engineer  Howell "Pete" Miller and Zantford "Granny" Granville spent three days of wind tunnel testing at NYU with aeronautical engineering professor Alexander Klemin. Granville reasoned that a teardrop-shaped fuselage would have lower drag than a straight-tapered one, so the fuselage was wider than the engine at its widest point (at the wing attachment point[s], within the length of the wing chord). The cockpit was located very far aft, just in front of the vertical stabilizer, in order to give the racing pilot better vision while making crowded pylon turns.

Operational history

The R-1 won the 1932 Thompson Trophy  race, piloted by Jimmy Doolittle. He lapped all but one ship in the race, made easy turns and never had to come down and make a tight pylon turn.

The distinction of a landplane record was noteworthy because, at that time, racing seaplanes outran landplanes, such as the then current speed record holder, a Supermarine S.6B which had averaged  on September 1931.

The Springfield Union newspaper of September 6, 1932 quoted Doolittle as saying, "She is the sweetest ship I've ever flown. She is perfect in every respect and the motor is just as good as it was a week ago. It never missed a beat and has lots of stuff in it yet. I think this proves that the Granville brothers up in Springfield build the very best speed ships in America today." Another Springfield paper of the same date quoted Doolittle as saying, "The ship performed admirably. She was so fast that there was no need of my taking sharp turns although if the competition had been stiffer I would have. I just hope Russell Boardman can take her out soon and bring her in for a new record. There were lots of things we might have adjusted more properly if we had had time to run tests with the ship, and they would have meant more speed. I am sure Russell Boardman can take her around at quite a bit more than 300 miles an hour so you see my record may not last long after all." 

He also personally wrote Zantford "Grannie" Granville a letter dated September 7, 1932, on Shell Petroleum stationery and addressed to Granville Brothers Aircraft, which reads as follows:

The R-1 rapidly acquired an reputation as a dangerous aircraft. This shortcoming was common to most racing machines of any kind. During the 1933 Bendix Trophy race, racing pilot Russell Boardman was killed, flying Number 11. During takeoff from a refueling stop in Indianapolis, Indiana, Boardman pulled up too soon, stalled the R-1 and crashed.

The R-1 was repaired but with an  fuselage extension, creating the "Long Tail Racer". The ship was painted with "I.F." on the cowl for intestinal fortitude and the same cartoon "Filaloola Bird" was painted on the side of the fuselage as it was on their successful Model YW. It was decided to save time by not to repairing the R-1 wings, but to use the original wings from the R-2, which had been removed in February 1933 when new wings with flaps were built and installed. The R-1/2, or "Longtail" aircraft carried race number 11 because the R-2's original wings were already painted as Number 11 and the repaired fuselage had to be painted regardless. This aircraft crashed in a landing overrun incident soon after it was built, but Roy Minor, the pilot, was not severely injured. The damage was not severe but there was no money left for repairs. 

The unrepaired Long Tail Racer was sold to Cecil Allen before the sheriff's bankruptcy auction ended the Granville Brothers company. Allen renamed the ship "Spirit of Right", built an entirely new wing with a different airfoil and added a new rear fuel tank for the long distance Bendix race. Former Granville Bros. chief engineer "Pete" Miller wrote to Allen warning for him never to put fuel in the rear tank as it would move the center of gravity far to the rear and make the ship too tail heavy to be flown. 

It is unlikely Allen ever attempted a fully fueled takeoff before the start of the race. In spite of all the fuel, there was no fire. After this final crash, the aircraft was never rebuilt.

Replicas

Non-flying replicas of the R-1 have been built at the New England Air Museum and the San Diego Air & Space Museum using original plans for the aircraft. Another is displayed at the Lyman and Merrie Wood Museum of Springfield History at the Springfield Museums. A flying replica of the R-2 was built by Steve Wolf and Delmar Benjamin that first flew in 1991. Benjamin flew an aerobatic routine in this aircraft at numerous airshows until he retired the aircraft in 2002. This aircraft was sold to Fantasy of Flight in 2004 and is on display in OrLampa, Florida.

Specifications (Gee Bee Super Sportster R-1)

In 1933, the R-2 was modified with the more powerful Pratt & Whitney Wasp and its cowling from the 1932 R-1 which was uprated for 1933 with the bigger, more powerful Pratt & Whitney R-1690 Hornet. Both racers also got an aluminum extension to their rudder.

References

Notes

Bibliography
 Benjamin, Delmar and Steve Wolf. Gee Bee. Osceola, Wisconsin: MBI Publishing Co., 1993. .
 Bowers, Pete M. The Gee Bee Racers, Number 51.  Leatherhead, Surrey, UK: Profile Publications Ltd., 1965.

 Granville, J.I. Farmers Take Flight. Springfield, Massachusetts: Copy Cat Print Shop, 2000. .
 Gilbert, James. The World's Worst Aircraft. Philadelphia, PA: Coronet Books, 1978. .
 Haffke, Henry A. Gee Bee: The Real Story of the Granville Brothers and Their Marvelous Airplanes. Colorado Springs, Colorado: VIP Publishers, Inc., 1989. .
 Mendenhall, Charles A. and Tom Murphy. The Gee Bee Racers: A Legacy of Speed. North Branch, Minnesota: Specialty Press, 1994. .
 Schmid, S.H. and Truman C. Weaver. The Golden Age of Air Racing: Pre-1940, 2nd rev. edition (EAA Historical Series). Osceola, Wisconsin: MBI Publishing Co., 1991. .
 Those Incredible Gee Bees (VHS 60 min). Springfield, Massachusetts: Studio 16, 1992.
 Winchester, Jim. The World's Worst Aircraft: From Pioneering Failures to Multimillion Dollar Disasters. London: Amber Books Ltd., 2005. .

External links

 Website dedicated to the Gee Bee "family" of aircraft designs
 Free Fiddlers Green Paper Model site with a good Gee Bee history page; (Model opens in pdf file)
 "Doolittle Tames the Gee Bee" Story of the 1932 Thompson Trophy race. Includes quotes, photos, video

Racing aircraft
1930s United States sport aircraft
Granville Brothers aircraft
Low-wing aircraft
Single-engined tractor aircraft
Aircraft first flown in 1932